The men's 50m backstroke S1 event at the 2012 Summer Paralympics took place at the  London Aquatics Centre on 6 September. There were no heats in this event.

Results

Final
Competed at 19:50.

 
Q = qualified for final. WR = World Record.

References
Official London 2012 Paralympics Results: Final 

Swimming at the 2012 Summer Paralympics